California's 53rd district may refer to:

 California's 53rd congressional district
 California's 53rd State Assembly district